The 1985 Little League World Series took place between August 20 and August 24 in Williamsport, Pennsylvania. The National Little League of Seoul, South Korea, defeated the Mexicali Little League of Mexicali, Mexico, in the championship game of the 39th Little League World Series.

This is the only LLWS championship game that featured two non-United States teams, as the team from Mexico represented the West Region of the United States.

This year also marked the debut of LLWS mascot DUGOUT

Teams

Championship bracket

Position bracket

Notable players
 Jim Brower (Minnetonka, Minnesota) – MLB and NPB pitcher from 1999–2008
 David Cortés (Mexicali, Baja California, Mexico) – MLB and KBO pitcher from 1999–2008

Notes

References

External links

Little League World Series
Little League World Series
Little League World Series